The MTV Video Music Award for Best Female Video is one of the original general awards that has been handed out every year since the first annual MTV Video Music Awards in 1984.  In 2007, however, the award was briefly renamed Female Artist of the Year, and it awarded the artist's whole body of work for that year rather than a specific video.  In 2008, though, the award returned to its original name. The category would become defunct beginning with the 2017 ceremony after the gender specific categories would be merged into the Artist of the Year category.

Madonna, Taylor Swift and Beyoncé are the biggest winners with three wins each, while the former also holds the record for most nominations with 12. Meanwhile, Beyoncé, Kelly Clarkson and Lady Gaga are the only artists to win the award for two consecutive years.

Recipients

Records/Stats
 Most Wins:
 1. Beyoncé, Madonna, Taylor Swift – 3 wins
 2. Kelly Clarkson, Janet Jackson, Lady Gaga – 2 wins
 Most Nominations, as of 2016 (including nominations for Female Artist of the Year)

See also

 List of music awards honoring women
 MTV Europe Music Award for Best Female

References 

 
MTV Video Music Awards
Music awards honoring women
Awards established in 1984
Awards disestablished in 2016